Hollie McNish is a poet and author based between Cambridge and Glasgow. She has published four collections of poetry: Papers (2012), Cherry Pie (2015), Why I Ride (2015), Plum (2017) and one poetic memoir on politics and parenthood, Nobody Told Me (2016), of which the Scotsman suggested “The world needs this book...and so does every new parent” and for which she won the Ted Hughes Award for New Work in Poetry. The latter has been translated into German, French and Spanish. McNish's sixth publication - a second cross-genre collection of poetry, memoir and short stories - Slug, and other things I've been told to hate, was published in May 2021 with Hachette with a further collection Lobster, due to come out in 2022, also with Hachette. In 2016, she co-wrote a play with fellow poet Sabrina Mahfouz, Offside, relating the history of British women in football. This was published as a book in 2017.

McNish has also released an album of poetry and music, Versus (2014), which made her the first poet to record an album at Abbey Road Studios, London.

As well as her own publications, McNish has written and performed poems for various campaigns and organisations, including The Economist Education Foundation, Durex's campaign for orgasm equality, and The Eve Appeal. She is a patron of Baby Milk Action, a network of over 270 citizens groups in more than 160 countries whose aim is 'to stop misleading marketing by the baby feeding industry... protect breastfeeding and babies fed on formula to prevent unnecessary death and suffering'.

Early life 
Born in Reading in 1983 to Scottish parents, McNish attended the local comprehensive school, Bucklebury Primary with a brief two year scholarship to Prior's Court School for the final years of this primary education. For secondary school, she attended St Bartholomew's Comprehensive School, Newbury, during which time she worked part-time at Little Chef, Chieveley Services and Boots the Chemist, Newbury, both of which she has written about in her fourth collection, Plum. She studied Modern and Medieval Languages at King's College, Cambridge, with a third year abroad teaching English in Guadeloupe, French West Indies, where she learnt Guadeloupian Creole to English translation. She went on to take a part-time master's degree in international development and economics at the School of Oriental and African Studies, University of London.

Career
Before becoming a full-time writer in 2014, McNish worked in Boots the Chemist, Soul Tree nightclub, Little Chef services, Mayhem Clothing Store and for five years as Administrative Assistant and later Education Officer with the East of England Urban Design Centre, Shape East.

Her first live poetry reading was at basement open mic night Poetry Unplugged, Poetry Café, Covent Garden, London. She has since performed worldwide at a number of UK and international events, alongside a variety of artists at Edinburgh's Neu!Reekie! events including Charlotte Church, Young Fathers, Jackie Kay and Kae Tempest. She tours most regularly with poets Vanessa Kisuule and Michael Pedersen.

In 2014 McNish adopted the pseudonym Hollie Poetry after online abuse led her to fear using her surname. She released one album, Versus,  in September 2014 under this pseudonym, recorded it at Abbey Road Studios and making her the first poet to do so. A second album Poetry versus Orchestra (2016) was later released, featuring McNish's poetry "in combination with music written by composer and conductor Jules Buckley and played by the Metropole Orkest." which was performed in a one of live concert at Cadogan Hall, London. In 2017 McNish returned to the use of her surname for all published works.

In 2016 BBC Radio 4 Woman's Hour broadcast a seven-part radio short documentary series hosted by McNish entitled Becoming a Mother: A Hot Cup of Tea with Hollie McNish which explored motherhood from many angles, including poverty, linguistic barriers, mothering as migrants and teenage parenting.

In 2018, she was artist in residence at Chester's Storyhouse.

As well as live events, McNish is also an advocate for online poetry readings and a number of McNish's YouTube videos have gone viral. By 2015 her youtube account had had over 4.1 million views. In 2020, during the coronavirus lockdown, McNish began her regular online event: Poems in Pyjamas, streamed each Sunday night between 9.30-10pm for free on her instagram and facebook channels.

Critical response
McNish's work has divided critics, with P. N. Review going so far as to refuse to review her 2018 Picador publication Plum, because 'to do so for a poetry journal would imply that it deserves to be taken seriously as poetry'. Following an online response from McNish, this article received coverage in several national news outlets such as The Guardian and the BBC. In the same year, Emma Watson named McNish, alongside other poets Rupi Kaur and Sabrina Mahfouz, as having reignited her love for poetry.

Commentary on her work has included:

"But even by the standards of the defiantly lawless world of performance poetry, McNish, the English-raised daughter of Scottish parents, must seem – to some, at least – like a bewildering law unto herself."

- The Scotsman

"...abundant in expletives and unintimidating to anyone who considers ignorance a virtue."

- PN Review

Publications

Poetry
Papers. London: Greenwich Exchange, 2012. .
Cherry Pie. Burning Eye, 2015. . Illustrated by various artists and illustrators.
Why I Ride: Because a Bike Pedal Lasts Longer Than a Gas Tank. Brattleboro, VT: Green Writers Press, 2015. .
Nobody Told Me: Poetry and Parenthood. London: Blackfriars, 2016. .
Plum. UK: Picador, 2017. .
Slug...and other things i'm told to hate. London: Fleet Publishing, 2021.

Play
Offside. Bloomsbury Methuen Drama, 2017. With Sabrina Mahfouz. .

Albums
Push Kick: A Journey Through the Beauty, Brilliance and Bollocks of Having a Baby (2010) Push Kick on Spotify
Touch (2010) Touch on Spotify
Versus (2014, Yup! Records) – Double album as Hollie Poetry
Poetry versus Orchestra (Mo Black, 2016) – with Jules Buckley and Metropole Orkest

Awards
2009: Winner, UK Slam Poetry Competition and went on to finish third in the global Slam Du Monde contest.
2015: Winner, Fellowships 2015, The Arts Foundation
2016: Ted Hughes Award for New Work in Poetry, for Nobody Told Me
2019: K Blundell Trust Award from Royal Society of Authors

References

External links

 – as Hollie Poetry
Hollie McNish - Recorded live at Abbey Road Studios
Becoming a Mother: A Hot Cup of Tea with Hollie McNish – BBC Radio 4 Woman's Hour documentary series hosted by McNish

Living people
People from Reading, Berkshire
21st-century English poets
Alumni of King's College, Cambridge
English women poets
21st-century English women writers
Slam poets
Writers from Berkshire
Alumni of SOAS University of London
English people of Scottish descent
1984 births
20th-century English women
20th-century English people